Belize Defence Force Football Club is a Belizean football team based in Belize City which currently competes in the Premier League of Belize of the Football Federation of Belize. It is sponsored by the country's national army of the same name. The Belize Defence Force F.C (or "Military Football Machine" as they are known at the national level) have won the Belize Premier Football League National Championship three times; the 2009–2010 Opening season,
the 2009–10 Closing season, and the 2010–11 Opening season.

The team is based in Belize. Their home stadium is MCC Grounds.

Current squad

List of Coaches
 José Salas (2009–2010)
 Gregory Cantun (2010–2015)
 Jerome Serrano (2016)

List of Club Presidents
 Ret. Col Javier Castellanos (2009–2011)
 Ret. Maj Lionel Cutkelvin (2010–2012)
 Maj Elryn Reyes (2013)
 Capt Victor Brecenio (2014)
 Capt Rogelio Pop (2015)
 Capt Kenrick Lincoln Martinez Sr. (2016)

External links
Belize Defence Force

Football clubs in Belize
2007 establishments in Belize
Association football clubs established in 2007
Military association football clubs